Sucré (also known as Sucré Dessert Boutique) was a dessert boutique that was based in New Orleans, Louisiana. In April 2007, the bakery of "Sucré Dessert Boutique" was started by Joel Dondis.

Naming

Sucré is the French word for sugared.  The bakery was also known as "Dessert Boutique" and "A Sweet Boutique." The term "boutique" is French meaning "shop," which stems from the Ancient Greek o (apothk), which means "storehouse." In English, the term boutique refers to fashion-oriented stores.

Location
Sucré was located on Magazine Street in New Orleans' Garden District. They had three retail sites in New Orleans' French Quarter and Metairie, Louisiana, and distributed the bulk of their merchandise throughout the United States through their website, which served as an online-shopping front for the stores.

History

Joel Dondis, a New Orleans restaurateur and former sous chef for Emeril Lagasse, owns Sucré. Dondis co-founded the store with pastry chef Tariq Hanna.

Sucré was New Orleans' first dessert-only restaurant when it launched in 2007. Sucré offered plated desserts with personalised garnishes, as well as confections such flavoured marshmallows, handcrafted chocolate bars, candied nuts, sipping chocolates, and freshly spun gelato and sundaes.

Sucré is owned by Joel Dondis, a New Orleans restaurant and former sous chef for Emeril Lagasse. Dondis and pastry chef Tariq Hanna co-founded the shop.

Sucré, New Orleans' first dessert-only restaurant, opened in 2007. Sucré served plated desserts with custom garnishes, as well as confections including flavor-infused marshmallows, artisan chocolate bars, candied almonds, sipping chocolates, and freshly spun gelato and sundaes.

Hanna sold his Sucré shares and departed the firm in 2018, formally stepping down as a consequence of sexual harassment claims. Joel Dondis took over as sole proprietor of Sucré Dessert Boutique. Sucré was closed on June 17, 2019, due to a bankruptcy and liquidation filing. Employees learned of the news when Joel Dondis summoned them to a parking lot and informed them that they no longer had a job. They were given the responsibility of leaving or emptying the sweets by disposing of them.

The business re-opened its original location in 2020, with a largely female team, under the new ownership of Ayesha Motwani.

References

External links
Shop Sucré

Chocolateries
Confectionery companies of the United States
American companies established in 2007
Food and drink companies established in 2007
Retail companies established in 2007
Retail companies disestablished in 2019
Shops in the United States
Food and drink companies of New Orleans